Big Stone Lake State Park is a state park of Minnesota, United States, on the shore of Big Stone Lake, the headwaters of the Minnesota River. It is home to wildlife including deer, raccoons, squirrels, meadowlarks, sedge wrens, pheasants, bobolinks, wild turkeys, thrashers, and mourning doves. South Dakota's Hartford Beach State Park is on the opposite shore of the lake. Big Stone Lake State Park is used for picnics, camping, hiking, and other outdoor recreation.

References

External links
Big Stone Lake State Park

1961 establishments in Minnesota
Protected areas established in 1961
Protected areas of Big Stone County, Minnesota
State parks of Minnesota